Distopyrenis is a genus of fungi in the family Pyrenulaceae.

References

External links
Distopyrenis at Index Fungorum

Pyrenulales
Lichen genera
Taxa named by André Aptroot
Eurotiomycetes genera